Auburn School District No. 408 is a public school district in King County, Washington, seated in Auburn. The district encompasses a 62 square-mile area bridging King County, Washington and Pierce County, Washington, and serves approximately 75,000 residents in Auburn, Algona, Pacific, and a small portion of Kent, as well as unincorporated census-designated places such as Lake Morton-Berrydale and Lake Holm.

In the 2018-2019 school year, the district had an enrollment of 17,505 students. Consisting of 14 elementary schools, 4 middle schools, 3 comprehensive high schools, and 1 alternative high school.

Growth in the last decade, prompted the district to build a total of 9 new schools (5 elementary schools, 2 middle schools, and 2 comprehensive high schools). While Auburn Mountainview High School is the newest comprehensive high school built since 1992, Auburn High School (formerly Auburn Senior High School) will be the newest building added to the Auburn School District in 2014.
The district employs 849 certified teachers, and staff, and 801 classified staff. In addition several former students from the district have become well known names, including Washington State governor, Christine Gregoire, Commander Dick Scobee, and several other notable names.

School Board

The Auburn School District Board of Directors consists of five members who are elected by the voters of the entire school district. Board members serve four-year staggered terms and must be a registered voter, at the time of their election or appointment, in the geographical region, known as a Director District, they represent on the board. The board sets school policies within the guidelines of the law and the State Board of Education. Board meetings are held on the second and fourth Monday of month at 7 p.m. at the James P. Fugate Administration Building board room, located at 915 4th St NE, Auburn, WA 98002. Special sessions are announced to the public in advance.

Schools

High schools
{| class="wikitable"
!School
!Location
!Mascot
!Colors
!Approx.Students
|-
|Auburn High School 
|Auburn
|Trojans
|Green/Gold
|align="right"|1,874
|-
|Auburn Riverside High School
|Auburn
|Ravens
|Navy Blue/Teal/Silver
|align="right"|1,742
|-
|Auburn Mountainview High School
|Auburn
|Lions
|Blue/Orange
|align="right"|1,429
|-
|West Auburn Secondary High School
|Auburn
|Wolves
|Grey
|align="right"|275
|}

Middle schools 6-8
 Cascade MS
Cascade Middle School is located in North Auburn, and has a student population of 750. School colors are purple and gold.  Mascot is the Spartans.
 Mt. Baker MS
Mt. Baker Middle School is located in the Southwest Region of Auburn. School colors are burgundy, grey and black.  Mascot is the Bulldogs.
 Olympic MS
Olympic Middle School is located in South Auburn and has about 700 students. School colors are blue and white.  Mascot is the Cougars.
 Rainier MS
Rainier Middle School is situated on Lea Hill and has 900 students. School colors are black and red   Mascot is the Panthers.

Elementary schools K-5
 Alpac ES
Located in Pacific, Washington - Opened in 1973 and named for the cities of Algona and Pacific. Originally an open classroom concept school, but converted to standard classroom ideals in 1983. School colors are red and black. Mascot is the Allstars.
 Arthur Jacobsen ES
Opened in 2007, on the former Jacobsen Tree farm and on the lower portion of Auburn Mountainview's campus. School colors are black and gold.  Mascot is the Thunderbirds.
 Bowman Creek ES
Opened in 2020, Bowman Creek us the 15th Elementary in the Auburn School District. School colors are blue and gold Mascot is the Bears.
 Chinook ES
Opened in 1963 and named for the nearby White River Fish Hatchery. Located on the Muckleshoot Indian Reservation.Chinook is getting a new school in 2022. School colors are blue and orange. Mascot is the Eagles.
 Dick Scobee ES
Dick Scobee Elementary opened in 1959 as North Auburn Elementary and was renamed for the famed astronaut and Auburn High School graduate who died as commander of the Space Shuttle Challenger, Dick Scobee. Dick Scobee was rebuilt in 2020-2021.  School colors are red, white and blue. Mascot is the Challengers. 
 Evergreen Heights ES
Opened in 1970, located on the West Hill of Auburn. School colors are green, yellow and white. Mascot is the Timberwolves.
 Gildo Rey ES
Opened in 1969, under the name of South Auburn Elementary and was renamed in 1976 in honor of a longtime faculty member, Gildo Rey. School colors are green and blue.  Mascot is the Hawks.
 Hazelwood ES
Opened 1990, on Auburn's Lea Hill. School colors are blue and black. Mascot is the Orcas. 
 Ilalko ES
Opened 1992. Named after a Native American village, the word "Ilalko" means "Striped Water." Located Next to Auburn Riverside.  School colors are teal and black.  Mascot is the Huskies.
 Lakeland Hills ES
Auburn's largest Elementary school, opened in the Lakeland Hills community 2006. School colors are red and grey. Mascot is the Wildcats.
 Lake View ES
Opened in 1980. School colors are red and black.  Mascot is the Cardinals.
 Lea Hill ES
Opened in 1965 as one of only 11 schools in the United States designated as a National Educational landmark by the National Park Service. Lea Hill is getting a new school in 2022.  School colors are purple and black.  Mascot is the Mustangs.
 Pioneer ES
Opened in 1950. Home of the Auburn Elites demo team. Pioneer re-opened with a new building in August 2021. School colors are red, white and blue. Mascot is the Patriots.
 Terminal Park ES
Opened in 1945 and it was named for the terminal end of the railroad and the neighborhood where the rail workers lived, Terminal Park.  Terminal Park is getting a new school in 2023. School colors are blue and yellow.  Mascot is the Tigers.  
 Washington ES
The oldest Elementary school in Auburn, located next to Auburn High School, originally opened in 1920, was demolished and re-built in 1970. School colors are red, white and blue. Mascot is the Explorers.
 Willow Crest ES
Willow Crest Elementary opened in 2022-23 school year. School colors are blue, light blue, and white.  School mascot is the Owls.

References

External links
 
 Auburn School District Report Card

Education in King County, Washington
School districts in Washington (state)
School districts established in 1896
1896 establishments in Washington (state)
Auburn, Washington